The 1991 Tour of the Basque Country was the 31st edition of the Tour of the Basque Country cycle race and was held from 8 April to 12 April 1991. The race started in Andoain and finished in Elgeta. The race was won by Claudio Chiappucci of the Carrera team.

General classification

References

1991
Bas